Joseph Graham (October 15, 1759  November 12, 1836) was a Revolutionary War militia officer, politician, and wealthy ironmonger from Mecklenburg County, North Carolina.

Life story
He was born on October 13, 1759 in Chester County, Pennsylvania to James Graham and Mary McConnell Barber Graham (2nd wife). His parents were both Scots-Irish. His father died before 1763 when he moved with his mother and siblings to Mecklenburg County, North Carolina. He became a farmer and ironmonger. In 1814 he was a Councilor of State for North Carolina. Later in life, he was on the board of trustees of the University of North Carolina.

Military service
Joseph served as a Patriot in the American Revolution:
 Captain, NC State Legion (1781-1782)
 Major, Lincoln County Regiment (1782-1783), commission on October 7, 1781, commissioned by Brig. Gen. Griffith Rutherford to serve under Col. Robert Smith. On July 25, 1782, he was under Col. Joseph Dickson (Lincoln County Regiment).

Severely wounded at the Battle of Charlotte on September 26, 1780. Graham was in many battles and skirmishes during the American Revolution including the actions at Stono, Charlotte, Cowan's Ford, Pyle's Defeat, Clapp's Mill, Raft Swamp, Moore's Plantation, Brick House, Seven Creeks and the Evacuation of Wilmington.

During the War of 1812, he was selected as a brigadier general to lead a brigade of North Carolina and South Carolina militia. As part of his service, Graham directed the construction of Fort Bainbridge located on the Federal Road in the Mississippi Territory (modern day Alabama).

After the wars, he assisted Archibald D. Murphey in preparation of a book on the history of North Carolina. Although the book was never completed, his manuscripts were included in the North Carolina archives and were compiled into a book by William A. Graham in 1904. This book includes a sketch of Joseph. A copy of a portrait of Joseph was made in the early 1800s.

Death
He died on November 12, 1836 in Vesuvius Furnace, Lincoln County, North Carolina. He was buried at the Machpelah Presbyterian Church Cemetery in Lincolnton, Lincoln County, North Carolina.

References

1759 births
1836 deaths
Ironmongers
North Carolina militiamen in the American Revolution
People from Chester County, Pennsylvania
People from Mecklenburg County, North Carolina
People of the Creek War